The Nationwide Volleyball Supercup is a competition featuring professional men volleyball clubs from Albania, North Macedonia and Kosovo and consists in 4 teams playing in a direct elimination through semi-finals and the final. The team with the most trophies is KV Shkëndija of Tetovë with 4 cups*. They won the most recent final against Studenti Tiranë of Albania, played in Tiranë by scoreline 3-0 (25:15, 25:20, 25:23).

Winners
These are the winners of the Nationwide Volleyball Supercup

Trophy Ranking

KV Shkëndija 4 times
 There are data missing for this tournament, updates will follow in the due course.

References

See also female competition
 Nationwide Volleyball Supercup (Women)

See also
 Albanian Volleyball Supercup
 Albanian Volleyball Cup

Volleyball in Albania